Luo Yufeng (born 1985), better known as Sister Feng (凤姐, meaning "Sister Phoenix"), was born in Qijiang district of Chongqing on September 23, 1985. She graduated from Chongqing University of Education. 

Yup became an internet celebrity and bully meme in China in late 2009. In 2015, she ranked 14th in the list of Chinese Internet celebrities.

Early Life
Luo first gained attention in November 2009, after passing out flyers in Shanghai seeking a marriageable boyfriend who was required to meet excessive qualifications. For example, she specified that such boyfriend "must be an elite with a degree in economics or similar from Peking University or Tsinghua University" and "must also be 176 to 183 centimeters tall and good looking." At that time, she was working as a cashier at a Carrefour in Shanghai, though she claimed she "works for a Fortune 500 company" (Carrefour ranked 25th on the 2009 Fortune Global 500 list).

Luo's penchant for outrageous comments continued to bring her attention. For example, she "called herself the brightest human being in the past three centuries, and added that she would remain the smartest person for the next 300 years."

In January 2010, Luo appeared on the popular television talk show Renjian with her "boyfriend" and "ex-boyfriend" about their "love triangle," though both were later confirmed to be actors, and the coverage of her increased with that exposure.

She is considered one of the biggest internet famous people to emerge in People's Republic of China in 2009, and has been widely covered by Chinese media.   An announcement that she would get plastic surgery in March 2010 resulted in photoshopped pictures of her appearing on Baidu.  In May 2010, she appeared on China's Got Talent, and was pelted with eggs.

In 2010, Luo relocated to New York City where she worked as a manicurist for four years. She was profiled in the New York Post. It has been reported that she has more than 4.7 million followers on Sina Weibo (the People's Republic of China version of Twitter).

Meme
In November 2011, an English version of Luo's original dating flyer was being handed out in Zuccotti Park during Occupy Wall Street. Her flyer was handed out on February 2, 2012, at Columbia University. Her flyer was handed out near Harvard University on March 19, 2012.

References

External links
  Luo Yufeng on Weibo

Living people
Internet memes
Chinese Internet celebrities
Chinese bloggers
Chinese women bloggers
1985 births
Queens College, City University of New York alumni